Acèrbi or Acerbi is an Italian surname. Notable people with the surname include:

Angelo Acerbi (born 1925), Italian Roman Catholic Archbishop of Zella and Apostolic Nuncio to New Zealand, the Netherlands, Colombia, Hungary, and Moldova
Francesco Acerbi (born 1988), Italian footballer
Giuseppe Acerbi (1773–1846), Italian naturalist, explorer and composer
Marco Acerbi (1949-1989), Italian hurdler
Mario Acerbi (1913–2010), Italian professional football player
Mario Acerbi (painter) (1887–1982), Italian painter

See also
Acerbis, Italian company
Paolo Acerbis (b. 1981), Italian professional football player

References

Italian-language surnames